Karuppu Vellai is a 1993 Indian Tamil-language film, directed by Manobala and produced by B. Venkatrama Reddy. The film stars Rahman, Sukanya, Nassar and Thilakan. It was released on 7 October 1993.

Plot

Cast 

Rahman as Surya
Sukanya as Swarna
Nassar as Kalyanasundaram
Thilakan as Sathyamoorthy
Srividya as Gayathri
Vennira Aadai Moorthy
Malaysia Vasudevan as Kalimuthu
Charle
Mohan Raman
Periya Karuppu Thevar
Kullamani
Ennatha Kannaiya
Krishnamurthy
D. Soundar
Rama Vasu
G. K.
Master Udayaraj
Radhakumari Kondalrao
Baby Monisha
Vellai Subbaiah
Pasi Narayanan

Soundtrack 
The music was composed by Deva.

Reception 
R. P. R. of Kalki called the film a return to form for Manobala.

References

External links 
 

1990s Tamil-language films
1993 films
Films directed by Manobala
Films scored by Deva (composer)